Michal Krčmář (born 23 January 1991) is a Czech biathlete. At the 2018 Winter Olympics he finished second in the 10 km sprint event.

He was a part of the silver junior men's relay at Biathlon Junior World Championships 2012. Since 2013–14 season he is competing regularly at Biathlon World Cup. He competed at the Biathlon World Championships 2013 in Nové Město na Moravě. He competed at the 2014 Winter Olympics in Sochi, in the individual contest. At the 2018 Winter Olympics he finished second in the 10 km sprint event.

His father, Daniel, represented Slovakia in biathlon at the 1994 Winter Olympics in Lillehammer.

Biathlon results
All results are sourced from the International Biathlon Union.

Olympic Games
1 medal (1 silver medal)

*The mixed relay was added as an event in 2014.

World Championships
1 medal (1 bronze)

*During Olympic seasons competitions are only held for those events not included in the Olympic program.
**The mixed relay was added as an event in 2005.

References

External links

1991 births
Living people
Czech male biathletes
Olympic biathletes of the Czech Republic
Biathletes at the 2014 Winter Olympics
Biathletes at the 2018 Winter Olympics
Biathletes at the 2022 Winter Olympics
Medalists at the 2018 Winter Olympics
Olympic medalists in biathlon
Olympic silver medalists for the Czech Republic
People from Vrchlabí
Biathlon World Championships medalists
Competitors at the 2015 Winter Universiade
Sportspeople from the Hradec Králové Region